John Henry Wood (14 April 1841 – 29 August 1914) was an English entomologist.

Wood was a physician (M.B.C.S), practising in Tarrington, Herefordshire. He wrote 45 scientific papers on Microlepidoptera and, later  Diptera and described several new species including Coleophora glaucicolella, Coleophora sylvaticella and Stigmella confusella . The description of Stigmella confusella was a collaboration with his friend Thomas de Grey, 6th Baron Walsingham.

References
T.A.C., 1914 Obit. Entomologist's Monthly Magazine 50(1914):277-278 

English entomologists
People from Herefordshire
1841 births
1914 deaths